Lecithocera autodyas is a moth in the family Lecithoceridae. It was described by Edward Meyrick in 1929. It is found on New Ireland.

The wingspan is about 14 mm. The forewings are lilac ochreous with the discal stigmata blackish, the first rather small, the second transverse. There are minute dark fuscous terminal dots on the veins. The hindwings are grey.

References

Moths described in 1929
autodyas